Evgeni Yordanov (born 4 February 1978) is a former Bulgarian football player who played as a forward.

Honours

Club
 CSKA Sofia
A Group (2): 2004–05, 2007–08
Bulgarian Supercup: 2008

References

External links
 footmercato profile

1978 births
Living people
Bulgarian footballers
Bulgarian expatriate footballers
First Professional Football League (Bulgaria) players
PFC Velbazhd Kyustendil players
PFC Spartak Varna players
OFC Pirin Blagoevgrad players
PFC Pirin Blagoevgrad players
PFC CSKA Sofia players
FC Amkar Perm players
PFC Marek Dupnitsa players
OFC Vihren Sandanski players
PFC Beroe Stara Zagora players
Association football forwards
Expatriate footballers in Russia
Russian Premier League players
People from Kyustendil
Sportspeople from Kyustendil Province